Hayrenyats is a village in the Artik Municipality of the Shirak Province of Armenia.

The climate is cold and temperate: with an average annual temperature of 6.3 degrees celsius and an average annual rainfall of 472mm.

Demographics
The population of the village since 1831 is as follows:

References 

Populated places in Shirak Province